Opus Zero is a 2017 Mexican-German drama film written and directed by Daniel Graham and starring Willem Dafoe.

Premise
An American composer, Paul, goes to a remote Mexican village where his father has died, ostensibly to collect his belongings, but in reality to either find inspiration for a new piece or to confront his own soul. He wanders the village talking to its residents, although he doesn’t speak Spanish. Meanwhile, a group of documentary filmmakers arrive in the village and, in talking with Paul, discover they have accidentally recorded a supernatural event.

Cast
Willem Dafoe as Paul
Andrés Almeida as Daniel
Brontis Jodorowsky as Zero
Cassandra Ciangherotti as Fernanda
Leonardo Ortizgris as Gilles
Irene Azuela as Maia
Noé Hernández as Priest
Valentina Manzini as Marianne

Production
The film was shot in Real de Catorce.

Reception
The film has a 42% rating on Rotten Tomatoes, based on 12 reviews, with an average rating of 5.30/10.

References

External links
 
 

English-language Mexican films
English-language German films
2010s Spanish-language films
Mexican drama films
German drama films
2017 drama films
2010s English-language films
2010s German films
2010s Mexican films